Desolation Center were an independent music and performing arts organization that held events in and around Los Angeles, California in the early 1980s. It was organized by Stuart Swezey and included local and national punk musicians. After hosting an arts events series at downtown LA locations, the group held three legendary concerts, titled Mojave Exodus, in the Mojave Desert in 1983. The bands that performed there included Sonic Youth, Minutemen, Meat Puppets, Redd Kross, Einstürzende Neubauten, Survival Research Laboratories, Savage Republic, and Swans.

Desolation Center is the subject of a 2018 documentary film of the same name.

References 

Citations

External links 

 Desolation Center on IMDb

Music festivals in Los Angeles
1980s in American music